The Trichy Tollgate is a place on the outskirts of Trichy and traditionally used for collecting toll taxes from road users.

Junctions
The road splits into four directions as mentioned below:
 one going towards Samayapuram and further towards Chennai
 one going towards Namakkal, Erode, Coimbatore, Salem, Bangalore
 one towards Trichy City
 one towards Lalgudi. Jeyamkondam

This is a major junction point in the region. As the location is near to the city, many apartments are built and being built. The place is growing rapidly.

Those who want to go to Samayapuram Mariamman Temple, they get down at Tollgate and take another bus from there. Also Tollgate is very near to one of the famous Hindu temple: Utthamar Kovil, temple of Lord Shiva, Vishnu and Bhrama

All town buses which go to Samayapuram will pass through Tollgate.

Neighbourhoods and suburbs of Tiruchirappalli